Clonoulty–Rossmore GAA is a Gaelic Athletic Association club located in the parish of Clonoulty and Rossmore, eleven miles from Cashel, County Tipperary in Ireland. The club is a traditional hurling club which is affiliated to the West Tipperary Board of the GAA.

History
The club was known as Clonoulty in its formative years and were the second winners of the Tipperary Senior Hurling Championship, in 1888. The club, in the name of Clonoulty-Rossmore had to wait 101 years for its second title in 1989 and won its third Championship title in 1997.

The Club's first champion team in 1888 (21 aside) was Thaddeus Ryan, John Ryan, Pat Butler, Thomas Harney, William Kennedy, Patsy Hennessy, Cornelius Ahearne, James Garrett, James Ryan, Pat Harney, John O'Dwyer, Joseph Gould, Martin Condon, Edward (Ned) Kennedy, John Murphy, Patsy Kennedy, Thomas Byrne, Daniel Ryan, James O'Dwyer, Pat Ryan, Pat Harney. Substitutes:  William Ryan, James English, Jim Quirke, James Ferncombe and Tom Hennessy.

The club acquired its club grounds in 1936, through the policy of reassignment of estate lands by the Irish Land Commission and completed its pavilion in 1957 mainly through the voluntary effort of the members of the Club Committee. Five club players have won All-Ireland Senior Hurling Championship medals with Tipperary - Tony Brennan (1945, 49, 50 & 51), Joe Hayes (1989 & 91), John Kennedy (1989 & 91), Declan Ryan (1989, 91 & 2001) and Aidan Butler (2001).  Declan Ryan also captained Tipperary to an All-Ireland Under-21 Hurling Championship in 1989, and two All-Stars with Tipperary senior in 1988 (No 10) and 1997 (No 11).

On 21 October 2018, Clonoulty-Rossmore won their first championship since 1997 after a 0-23 to 2-13 win against Nenagh Éire Óg in the final.

Player Dillon Quirke collapsed and died while playing for the club in a County Senior Championship match against Kilruane at Semple Stadium in August 2022.

Honours
 Tipperary Senior Hurling Championship (4)
 1888, 1989, 1997, 2018
 Tipperary County Senior Hurling League (1)
 2009
 Tipperary Minor Hurling Championship (2)
 1981, 1996.
 West Tipperary Senior Hurling Championship (20)
 1930 (Clonoulty), 1931 (Clonoulty), 1932 (Clonoulty), 1933 (Clonoulty), 1951, 1989, 1992, 1996, 1998, 2002, 2007, 2008, 2009, 2010, 2011, 2012, 2016, 2017, 2018, 2019
 West Tipperary Senior Hurling League (9)
 1945, 1950, 1969, 1985, 1988, 1989, 1991, 1992, 1997
 West Tipperary Junior Hurling Championship (10)
 1936 (Clonoulty), 1944, 1945, 1956 (Rossmore), 1958, 1965, 1969, 1973, 1974, 1983.
 West Tipperary Minor (A) Hurling Championship (15)
 1969, 1970, 1981, 1982, 1985, 1986, 1996, 1998, 2004, 2005, 2008, 2010, 2011, 2014, 2015
 West Tipperary Minor (B) Hurling Championship (2)
 1989, 2002 (with Solohead).
 Tipperary Minor (B) Football Championship (1)
 2015
 West Tipperary Minor (B) Football Championship (3)
 2011, 2012, 2015
 Tipperary Under-21 A Hurling Championship (1) 
 2018
 West Tipperary Under-21 (A) Hurling Championship (20)
 1971, 1972 (Clonoulty/Éire Óg),), 1973 (Clonoulty/Éire Óg),), 1981, 1982, 1984, 1985, 1988, 1989, 1995, 1996, 2000, 2005, 2006, 2007, 2009, 2011, 2012, 2013, 2014.
 West Tipperary Under-21 (B) Hurling Championship (2)
 1991, 1993.
 Tipperary Intermediate Football Championship
 1986
 West Tipperary Intermediate Football Championship (3)
 1986, 1991, 2020.
 Tipperary Junior A Football Championship: (4)
 1969, 1985, 2000, 2016
 West Tipperary Junior Football Championship (7)
 1931, 1969, 1985, 1994, 1996, 2000, 2016
 West Tipperary Under-21 (B) Football Championship (1)
 1997
 West Tipperary Junior A Hurling Championship (8)
 1936 (as Clonoulty), 1944, 1958, 1974, 1983, 2012, 2014, 2016 
 Mid Tipperary Junior A Hurling Championship (1)
 1919

Notable players
 Tony Brennan
 Aidan Butler
 Phil Byrne
 Anthony Carew
 John Devane
 Tim Gleeson
 Timmy Hammersley
 Joe Hayes
 John Kennedy
 Peter Maher
 John O'Keeffe
 John O'Neill
 Dan Quirke
 Dillon Quirke
 Declan Ryan

References

Bibliography
Tipperary's GAA Story (1960), Canon Philip Fogarty
The Complete Handbook of Gaelic Games (2005), Editor Des Donegan

External links
Tipperary GAA site
Official Clonoulty–Rossmore GAA Club website

Gaelic games clubs in County Tipperary
Hurling clubs in County Tipperary
Gaelic football clubs in County Tipperary